Govenia utriculata is a species of orchid. It is widespread across much of Latin America and the West Indies, from Mexico and Puerto Rico south to Argentina.

References

External links

utriculata
Orchids of North America
Orchids of South America
Plants described in 1788